The Colorado Criminal Defense Bar (founded May 8, 1979) is a professional association of attorneys, investigators, and paralegals who represent persons accused of crime.  The CCDB (as it is abbreviated) was created and established by attorneys Michael F. DiManna, Harold A. Haddon, Gary M. Jackson, Bryan Morgan, and Peter H. Ney, a Judge of the Colorado Court of Appeals — all of Denver, Colorado — and William Gray of Boulder, Colorado (CCDB website). The "President's Council" comprises "former presidents of the CCDB and is chaired by the current President of the CCDB" ("President's Council", CCDB website).

Mission statement
(From the CCDB website:)

President's Council
(From the CCDB website:)

 

Past Presidents and Presidents Council Members
Michael DiManna (1979–81), Dimanna & Jackson
Lee D. Foreman (1981–82), Haddon, Morgan, Mueller, Jordan, Mackey & Foreman, PC
Jonathan I. Olom (1982–83), (8/5/50 – 10/28/84)
John M. Richilano (1983–84), Richilano & Gilligan, PC
Jane S. Hazen (1984–85), Attorney at Law 
Larry S. Pozner (1985–86), Reilly Pozner LLP
Norman R. Mueller (1986–87), Haddon, Morgan, Mueller, Jordan, Mackey & Foreman, PC
Patrick J. Burke (1987–88), Patrick J. Burke, PC
Jeffrey A. Springer (1988–89), Springer & Steinberg
Saskia A. Jordan (1989–90), Haddon, Morgan, Mueller, Jordan, Mackey & Foreman, PC
Robin Desmond (1990–91), Attorney at Law
Michael R. Enwall (1991–92), Attorney at Law
Jeffrey S. Paglicua (1992–93)
David Kaplan (1993–94), Haddon, Morgan, Mueller, Jordan, Mackey & Foreman, PC
Janine Yunker (1994–95), Federal Public Defender's Office
G. Paul McCormick (1995–96), McCormick & Christoph, PC
Daniel Recht (1996–97), Recht & Kornfeld, PC
Forrest "Boogie" Lewis (1997–98), Forest W. Lewis, PC
Edward Nugent (1998–99), Nugent & Palo, LLC
Lindy Frolich (1999–2000), Alternate Defense Counsel
Robert Pepin (2000–01), Federal Public Defender's Office
Philip Cherner (2001–02), Attorney at Law
James Castle (2002–03), Attorney at Law
Carrie Thompson (2003–04), Colorado State Public Defender's Office
Mark T. Langston (2004–05), Mark T. Langston, PC
Patrick Ridley (2005–06), Ridley, McGreevy & Weisz, PC
Thomas Hammond (2006–07), Attorney at Law
Nancy Holton (2007-2008)
Maureen O'Brien (2008-2009)
Martin Stuart (2009-2010), McDermott Stuart & Ward LLP
Sean McDermott (2013-2014), McDermott Stuart & Ward LLP

External links
Official website

Colorado law
Law-related professional associations
1979 establishments in Colorado
Organizations established in 1979